STS-66 was a Space Shuttle program mission that was flown by the Space Shuttle Atlantis. STS-66 launched on 3 November 1994 at 11:59:43.060 am EDT from Launch Pad 39-B at NASA's Kennedy Space Center. Atlantis landed at Edwards Air Force Base on 14 November 1994 at 10:33:45 am EST.

Crew

Mission highlights

The Atmospheric Laboratory for Applications and Sciences – 3 (ATLAS-03) was the primary payload aboard STS-66. It continued the series of Spacelab flights to study the energy of the sun and how it affects the Earth's climate and environment. The ATLAS-03 mission made the first detailed measurements from the Shuttle of the Northern Hemisphere's middle atmosphere in late fall. The timing of the flight, when the Antarctic ozone hole is diminishing, allowed scientists to study possible effects of the ozone hole on mid-latitudes, the way Antarctic air recovers, and how the northern atmosphere changes as the winter season approaches.

In addition to the ATLAS-03 investigations, the mission included deployment and retrieval of the Cryogenic Infrared Spectrometer Telescope for Atmosphere, or CRISTA. Mounted on the Shuttle Pallet Satellite, the payload is designed to explore the variability of the atmosphere and provide measurements that will complement those obtained by the Upper Atmosphere Research Satellite launched aboard Discovery in 1991. CRISTA-SPAS is a joint U.S./German experiment.

Other payloads in Atlantis'''s cargo bay included the Shuttle Solar Backscatter Ultraviolet (SSBUV-7) payload and the Experiment on the Sun Complementing ATLAS (ESCAPE-II). Payloads located in the middeck include the Physiological & Anatomical Rodent Experiment (PARE/NIR-R), Protein Crystal Growth-Thermal Enclosure (PCG-TES), Protein Crystal Growth- Single Locker (PCG-STES), Space Tissue Loss/National Institute of Health (STL/NIH-C), Space Acceleration Measurement System (SAMS) and the Heat Pipe Performance-2 Experiment (HPP-2).

STS-66 further advanced comprehensive effort to collect data about sun's energy output, chemical makeup of the Earth's middle atmosphere, and how these factors affect global ozone levels. Seven instruments on the Atmospheric Laboratory for Applications and Science-3 (ATLAS-3) also flew on first two ATLAS flights. No other collection of space-based instruments provides the same extensive range of atmospheric measurements. Also considered a primary payload was the Cryogenic Infrared Spectrometers and Telescopes for the Atmosphere-Shuttle Pallet Satellite (CRISTA-SPAS), continuing joint NASA-German Space Agency (DARA, now the DLR) series of scientific missions. ATLAS-3 and CRISTA-SPAS considered as joint mission with single set of science objectives. During the mission the crew divided into two teams for around-the-clock research.

ATLAS-3 instruments, mounted on a Spacelab pallet in the cargo bay, included Atmospheric Trace Molecule Spectroscopy (ATMOS), which collected more data on trace gases in the atmosphere than on all three of its previous flights combined; Shuttle Solar Backscatter Ultraviolet Spectrometer (SSBUV), which took ozone measurements to calibrate ozone monitor on aging NOAA-9 satellite as well as cooperative measurements with other ATLAS-3 instruments; Active Cavity Radiometer Irradiance Monitor (ACRIM), which took extremely precise measurements of the sun's total radiation for 30 orbits as calibration reference for sister instrument on Upper Atmosphere Research Satellite (UARS) launched in 1991; Measurement of the Solar Constant (SOLCON), provided by Belgium, which also measured solar radiation but as reference point to track changes over years; Solar Spectrum Measurement (SOLSPEC), French instrument, measured the Sun's radiation as function of wavelength; and Solar Ultraviolet Spectral Irradiance Monitor (SUSIM), which collected its highest precision solar ultraviolet radiation measurements in its 15-year lifetime. Millimeter Wave Atmospheric Sounder (MAS), collected nine hours of observations, measuring distribution of water vapor, chlorine monoxide and ozone at altitudes between 12 and 60 miles  (20 to ), before computer malfunction halted instrument operations.

CRISTA-SPAS released from orbiter's Remote Manipulator System arm on second day of mission. Flying at distance of about 25 to 44 miles  (40 to ) behind the Shuttle, payload collected data for more than eight days before being retrieved and returned to the cargo bay. The CRISTA instrument gathered first global information about medium and small scale disturbances in trace gases in middle atmosphere, which could lead to better models of the atmosphere and Earth's energy balance. The second CRISTA-SPAS instrument, the Middle Atmosphere High Resolution Spectrograph Investigation (MAHRSI) measured amounts of ozone-destroying hydroxyl and nitric oxide in the middle atmosphere and lower thermosphere from 24 to 72 miles  (40 to ). MAHRSI yielded first complete global maps of hydroxyl in atmosphere.

For retrieval of CRISTA-SPAS, a different approach method to the spacecraft was successfully tested as a prelude to the upcoming U.S. Shuttle/Russian Space Station Mir docking flights. Called R-Bar approach, it is expected to save propellant while reducing risk of contamination to Mir systems from orbiter thruster jet firings. STS-66 was the last solo shuttle flight for Atlantis for over 14 years, as her upcoming missions were dedicated to Mir, and ISS flights. Atlantis'' would not fly solo again until STS-125 (The final Hubble Space Telescope Mission).

See also

 List of human spaceflights
 List of Space Shuttle missions
 Outline of space science
 Space Shuttle

External links
 NASA mission summary 
 STS-66 Video Highlights 

Space Shuttle missions
Edwards Air Force Base
Spacecraft launched in 1994
Spacecraft which reentered in 1994
1994 in Florida
1994 in California
November 1994 events